Srikanth Kondapalli is the Dean of School of International Studies and a Professor of China studies at Jawaharlal Nehru University, New Delhi, India.

Kondapalli is a frequent writer and commentator in the national and international media. He has been quoted regularly in BBC News, China Daily, Der Spiegel, The Atlantic, The New York Times, The Indian Express, The Guardian, The Times of India, The Wall Street Journal, The Washington Post, and Xinhua.

Education 

Kondapalli completed his degrees in Bachelor of Arts and Master of Arts in History from Osmania University, Hyderabad. Later he completed his degrees in Master of Philosophy (in 1989) and Doctor of Philosophy (in 1995) in Chinese studies from the School of International Studies, Jawaharlal Nehru University, New Delhi. He studied Chinese language at Beijing Language & Culture University and was a postdoctoral researcher cum visiting fellow at People's University, Beijing from period 1996–1998.

Bibliography

Books 
 China's Military, the PLA in Transition (1st edition). New Delhi: South Asia Books. .
 China's Naval Power. New Delhi: Institute for Defence Studies and Analyses. .
 China and its Neighbours. New Delhi: Pentagon Press. .
 China's Military and India. New Delhi: Pentagon Press. .
 China and the BRICS Setting Up a Different Kitchen (2017 edition). New Delhi: Pentagon Press. .
 One Belt, One Road: China's Global Outreach. New Delhi: Pentagon Press. .

Awards 
 K. Subrahmanyam Award (2010)

References 

Living people
Indian sinologists
Academic staff of Jawaharlal Nehru University
Osmania University alumni
Scholars from Andhra Pradesh
Year of birth missing (living people)